Marriott may refer to:

People
Marriott (surname)

Corporations 
 Marriott Corporation, founded as Hot Shoppes, Inc. in 1927; split into Marriott International and Host Marriott Corporation in 1993
 Marriott International, international hotel company
 Marriott Hotels & Resorts, flagship brand of Marriott International
 Marriott Vacations Worldwide Corporation, a timeshare company, formerly a division of Marriott International
 Host Marriott Corporation, lodging real estate investment trust, now known as Host Hotels & Resorts
 HMSHost, operator of airport concession services, spun off from Host Marriott Corporation

Places 
 Marriott, Saskatchewan, Canada
 Rural Municipality of Marriott No. 317, Saskatchewan
 Marriott, Utah

Other uses 
 Marriott (album)

See also
 Mariotte (disambiguation)